Alarm für Cobra 11: Highway Nights (also known as Crash Time III) is a racing video game developed by Synetic Games and published by RTL Playtainment. It is the third game adapted from the Alarm für Cobra 11 – Die Autobahnpolizei television series. The game was launched on 27 November 2009 for Xbox 360 and PC.

Gameplay

The story is about Semir Gerkhan and Ben Jäger (the duo from the previous game, Burning Wheels) who are assigned to infiltrate terrorist activity in the city and the Autobahn. The vehicles are fictitious but resemble some famous cars. All cars have a generic C11 emblem (or the word Cobra) and a number plate starting with the initials SY, representing Synetic Games as the creator. Usually, the cars come in 3 types, and the third type of the vehicle is usually a tuned-up version. The game consists of more than 70 missions, an area of 32 square kilometres with more than 200 kilometres of city streets (based on Berlin) and Autobahn, 47 vehicles to choose from, Story Mode with a dense story atmosphere, a dynamic in-game GPS, and a typical ambience of the series, with explosive crashes and high-speed chases.

Objectives

Players not only have to complete tasks, but they have to do them as successfully as possible. The missions are rated up to five stars. The player loses a star if their tries, shots, tasks, or time does not stay within certain limits. Not only do the stars affect gameplay, but they also affect the player's overall rating; if they complete their missions without receiving any stars (or with a low quantity of stars), their rating will be affected negatively.

Suspects

There are a few things the player can do with suspects when they drive up to them on patrol, but in the missions, the player has to do a specific task with the suspect. The suspect vehicles use the pathfinder system (a system in which an AI vehicle follows a randomised route) as well, so the path they use is not the same.

Pursuit; Chase down the suspect. The player arrests him by either shooting his car, totalling it, or using the PIT manoeuvre (hitting the back-end at the side to put the suspect into a spin.) and stopping in front of him. For some specific missions, the player can use the drone to destroy the suspect vehicle.
Shadowing; Keeping a distance from the suspect. They must not get too close nor drive too far. The player should not make too much noise, either (ex. blaring their horn or crashing into too many traffic cars or obstacles). They should not turn on the police lights and the siren, either. Also, the player has to make sure that they do not bump the suspect, as that can be a dead giveaway. If the player waits a while as they're shadowing the suspect, the meter on the top left corner decreases in the level where the suspect notices the player.
Race; If this happens during a patrol, the player has to drive to a specific place and stop there before the suspect does.

References

2009 video games
Xbox 360 games
Windows games
Video games based on Alarm für Cobra 11 – Die Autobahnpolizei
Video games about police officers
Video games developed in Germany